Hatem Abd Elhamed (or Elhamid, ; born 18 March 1991) is an Israeli professional footballer who plays as a defender for Hapoel Haifa and the Israel national team.

Early life
Elhamed was born in Kafr Manda, Israel, to a Muslim-Arab family. His younger brother Muhammad died in a car accident in 2008.

Club career

Early career
Abd Hamed started playing football at the age of 16 in the youth teams of Bnei Sakhnin. He did this for two years, and he was transferred to Maccabi Tel Aviv in 2009. He played one season in the youth series. In the 2010/11 season, he signed a professional contract in his team Maccabi Tel Aviv FC. Abd Elhamed made his professional debut on 8 August 2010 in a Toto Cup match against his boyhood club, Bnei Sakhnin. 

On 1 February 2011, Abd Elhamid was loaned to Charleroi in Belgium. A month later, he made his league debut for Charleroi, coming on as a substitute for Ederson in the 73rd minute against Standard Liège on 12 March 2011. Charleroi had stipulated a purchase option, but did not purchase the player.

Ashdod
The next season, he was transferred to F.C. Ashdod, a team in the  First Division.  In his first season, he started 8 times in the basic team, and he was 15 times a substitute. In the following 2012–13 season, he became a regular player in the team. He was 20 times in the starting team and two times a substitute. On 6 January 2013, he scored his first professional goal at the age of 21. This game against Maccabi Haifa ended in a 4–1 defeat. In his third season (2013/14), he was 17 times in the starting team and four times a substitute.

In summer 2014, he started his fourth season at Ashdod. The first sixteen matches of the competition, he was 12 times on the field, of which 7 times in the basic team. Nevertheless, it was decided to send him on loan to the Romenian team Dinamo Bucharest.

His period on loan at the Romanian top team was his second passage outside Israel. He was directly selected for the first team in 13 of the last 17 matches, almost every time as a starting player. On 24 April, he scored his first goal in the team, in a 1–1 draw against Cluj. In May, the last month of the season, he made scored more goals and gave two assists. However, Dinamo Bucharest was not willing to pay the transfer sum of €100,000, so Elhamed returned to Israel. In June 2015, he started a trial at Club Brugge.

In July 2015, he signed until mid-2019 at Belgian side K.A.A. Gent. On 15 July 2016 loaned back to F.C. Ashdod.

Hapoel Be'er Sheva
In August 2017, he signed a five-year contract at Hapoel Be'er Sheva.

Celtic
On 24 July 2019, Scottish champions Celtic announced the signing of Abd Elhamed from Hapoel Be’er Sheva on a four-year contract. Celtic manager Neil Lennon said in February 2021 that Abd Elhamed had been suffering from homesickness, as his family was still living in Israel and he was unable to visit them due to the COVID-19 pandemic.

Return to Be'er Sheva
Abd Elhamed returned to Hapoel Be'er Sheva in February 2021.

International career
In 2009, Abd Elhamed was selected to represent Israel at the 2009 Maccabiah Games.

He made his Israel national football team debut on 10 June 2019 in a Euro 2020 qualifier against Poland, as an 82nd-minute substitute for Nir Bitton.

In October 2020, Abd Elhamed tested positive for COVID-19 while away on international duty.

Career statistics

Honours
Hapoel Be'er Sheva 
Premier League (1): 2017–18
State Cup (1): 2021–22
Super Cup (1): 2022

Celtic 
 Premiership (1): 2019–20

References

External links
 
 
 
 
 

1991 births
Living people
Arab citizens of Israel
Israeli footballers
Israel youth international footballers
Israel international footballers
Arab-Israeli footballers
Maccabiah Games footballers
Maccabiah Games bronze medalists for Israel
Footballers from Kafr Manda
Maccabi Tel Aviv F.C. players
R. Charleroi S.C. players
F.C. Ashdod players
FC Dinamo București players
K.A.A. Gent players
Hapoel Be'er Sheva F.C. players
Celtic F.C. players
Hapoel Haifa F.C. players
Israeli Premier League players
Belgian Pro League players
Liga I players
Scottish Professional Football League players
Israeli expatriate footballers
Expatriate footballers in Belgium
Expatriate footballers in Romania
Expatriate footballers in Scotland
Israeli expatriate sportspeople in Belgium
Israeli expatriate sportspeople in Romania
Israeli expatriate sportspeople in Scotland
Association football defenders
Maccabiah Games medalists in football
Israeli Muslims